Ith Prang  is a Cambodian politician. He belongs to the Cambodian People's Party and was elected to represent Kampong Cham in the National Assembly of Cambodia in 2003.

References

Cambodian People's Party politicians
Members of the National Assembly (Cambodia)
Living people
Year of birth missing (living people)
Place of birth missing (living people)